The 1999 Italian presidential election was held on 13 May 1999. As a second-level, indirect election, only Members of Parliament and regional deputies were entitled to vote. Carlo Azeglio Ciampi was elected head of state of the Italian Republic, a role of representation of national unity and guarantee that Italian politics comply with the Constitution, in the framework of a parliamentary system.

On 13 May, the former Prime Minister Carlo Azeglio Ciampi was elected on the first ballot with 707 votes. His term officially started with a swearing-in ceremony held on 18 May.

Procedure 
According with the Italian Constitution, the election must be held in the form of secret ballot, with the Senators, the Deputies and 58 regional representatives allowed to cast their votes. When the 1999 election was held, the Senate counted 322 members and the Chamber of Deputies counted 630 members; the electors were in total 1010. The election is held in the Palazzo Montecitorio, home of the Chamber of Deputies, with the capacity of the building being expanded for the purpose. The first three ballots require a two-thirds majority of the voters in order to elect a President. The election is conducted by the President of the Chamber of Deputies, who has the authority to proceed to the public counting of the votes. The presidential mandate lasts seven years.

On 13 May 1999, the President of the Chamber of Deputies Luciano Violante, in agreement with the President of the Senate Nicola Mancino, convened the two houses of the Italian Parliament, integrated with a number of representatives appointed by the twenty Italian regions, in a common session in order to commence voting for the election of the new President of the Italian Republic.

Proposed candidates

Ballots

First ballot (13 May)
Prime Minister Massimo D'Alema initially proposed Carlo Azeglio Ciampi as government's official candidate, in an attempt to reach an agreement with the House of Freedoms, whose votes would have been necessary to have a successful election at the first ballot. The centre-right opposition then declared its intent to vote for Ciampi.

The voting resulted in the election of Carlo Azeglio Ciampi as President of the Italian Republic.

Results

Notes 

Presidential elections in Italy
1999 elections in Italy